This is a list of New Zealand-made television programmes broadcast by Warner Bros. Discovery New Zealand.

The free-to-air channels Three, Bravo, Eden, Rush, HGTV, streaming service ThreeNow, and current affairs service Newshub are operated by Warner Bros. Discovery.

Bravo
The following programmes were screened on Bravo.

Current programming

Reality / non-scripted
 The Circus (2021)
 The Real Housewives of Auckland (2016)

Three
The following programmes were screened on Three.

Current programming

Former programming

Dramas

Comedies

 7 Days of Sport (2015)
 A Thousand Apologies (2008)
 After Hours (2014)
 AotearoHA: Next Big Things (2011)
 AotearoHA: Rising Stars (2015)
 Ben & Steve: World Famous In (2013)
 Ewen Gilmour: Westie Legend (2015)
 Love Mussel (2001)
 The Millen Baird Show (2008)
 Poking the Borax (2011)
 The Radio (2013)
 Skitz (1993–97)
 Tele Laughs (1996–97)

Reality / non-scripted

 111 Emergency (2011)
 Big (2011)
 The Big Stuff (2008)
 Cafe Secrets (2011–12)
 Candid Camera (1991–92)
 Creative Living (2016)
 Crime Exposed (2013)
 Does My Bum Look Big? (2007)
 Dog Patrol (2011)
 Drug Bust (2011–12)
 Emergency Heroes (2009–10)
 The Family (2003)
 Family Secret (2013–14)
 Fusion Feasts (2013–14)
 Hitched (2009–10)
 Honey, We're Killing the Kids (2006)
 New Zealand's Hottest Home Baker (2010–13)
 Hot Property (2000–03)
 The Kitchen Job (2008–10)
 Lost & Found (2015–19)
 Marae DIY (2015–16, moved from and back to Māori Television)
 Million Dollar Catch (2009)
 Money Man (2006–09)
 Native Kitchen (2015–16)
 A New Zealand Food Story (2020)
 Noise Control (2011)
 On the Grill (2012)
 Police Stop (1996–97)
 Reality Trip (2015)
 Reel Late with Kate (2010–11)
 The Ridges (2012)
 Road Madness (2012–15)
 Lion Red. RUGBY CLUB (1998) About the North Harbour rugby union in the 1998 NPC first division season.
 Saving Gen-Y (2013)
 The Secret Lives of Dancers (2010–14)
 Sing Like a Superstar (2005)
 Smokefreerockquest (1996, 1998–2000, 2006, 2016)

 Testing the Menu (2013)
 Think Tank (2011–13)
 Thirsty Work (2016)
 Ansett New Zealand Time of Your Life (1996–97)
 Under the Grill (2011)
 What's Really in Our Food? (2008–12)
 World Kitchen (2009–11)

Awards shows
 Aotearoa Film & Television Awards (2011)

Game shows

 Off the Planet (1997)
 Perfect Match (1989–1990)
 The Price Is Right (1992)

News and information

 5:30 Live (1993–94)
 Four Corners (1993–94)

Documentaries

 Aftershock – Would You Survive? (2008)
 Both Worlds (2012–18)
 The Eruption: Stories of Survival (2020)
 Funny Roots (2012)
 The Good Shit (2018)
 Great War Stories (2014–18)
 House of Champions (2019)
 Inside New Zealand (1991–2013)
 The James Gang Rides Again (9 August 1990)
 Kiwis Coming Home (2021)
 Missing Pieces (2009–12)
 Options (1990)
 Pacman (1990)
 Prison Families (2013–14)
 The Race for Motutapu (2018)
 Reaching for the Skies (1990)
 Rocked the Nation: 100 NZ Sporting Moments (2011)
 Stan (2018)
 Taranaki Hard (2020)
 Te Mana Te Ihi Te Wairua (1990)
 Til Death Do Us Part: The Antony de Malmanche Story (2015)
 The Valley (2017)
 Waka (1990)
 Who Owns New Zealand Now? (2017)

Sports

 Aussie Big League (1993–94)
 Cup Talk (2011)
 Golf World (2013–16)
 Makita Sports Machine (1994)
 Mobil Motorsport Show (1996)
 Mobil Sport (1990–95)
 Reebok 3 Sport Sunday (1992)
 Sportsworld (1989)
 Wynn's Sport (1990–91)

Children's and youth programming

 Aunties' Alphabet (1991)
 Ice As (2000)
 Ice TV (1995–1999)
 Push Play (2010)
 Short Sportz (1991–93)
 The Simon Eliot Show (2007–08)

Saturday morning

 Pacific Beat St (2006–10)
 Ya Hoo (1991–93)

Television films

 Aftershock (2008)

ThreeNow
The following programmes were released on ThreeNow.

Children's programming

Former channels

C4
The following programmes were screened on C4.

Comedy
 Back of the Y (2008–09)
 Bogan Family Films (2010)
 Jono’s New Show (2008)
 The Jono Project (2010)
 Pulp Sport (2003–04)

Reality / non-scripted
 Making Tracks (2008–10)
 Roll the Dai (2007)
 Roll the Dai: Outback (2008)
Smokefreerockquest (2007–10)
 Studentville (2006–07)

Documentaries
 Rocked the Nation: 100 NZ Music Moments (2008)
 Rocked the Nation 2: 100 NZ Pop Culture Stories (2009)

Game shows
 Pop! Goes the Weasel (2005–07)
 Celebrity Joker Poker (2007–08)

Awards shows
 New Zealand Music Awards (2004–10)

News and information
 Special Features (2005–08)

Music shows

 6 Degrees
 10 Reasons
 10 Years Of... (2007)
 Added This Week (2003)
 Ampd (2003–06)
 The Big Breakfast (2007)
 Blender (2004)
 The Boost Mobile Holla Hour (2006)
 C4U (2013)
 Edge Chart (2003)
 The Best...
 Spoon 
 Homegrown (2003)
 Insert Video Here
 Intellectual Property (2003–06)
 The Official NZ Top 40 (2003–10)
 Select (2003–10)
 Select Live (2003–10)
 So Hot Right Now
 Steel Mill
 Top 10/100
 U Choose 40 (2006–11, 2013)
 Video Hits
 What's The Theme?
 Fade To Black

Four
The following programmes were screened on Four.

Children's programming
 Kiwisport TV (2011)
 The Moe Show (2013–16)
 Sticky TV (2011–16)

News and information
 Drew and Shannon Live (2011)
 Four Live (2012–14)

Reality / non-scripted
 The GC (2015)
 Smirnoff Night Project (2011)
 Smokefreerockquest (2011–15)

Awards shows
 New Zealand Music Awards (2011–14)

References

Warner Bros. Discovery New Zealand